Young rider classification is a cycling jersey competition in multi-day stage race events, such as the Tour de France, Giro d'Italia and many others, which awards the current leader by overall time for riders below the age of twenty-six years (or twenty-three years) depending on the race rules. At the Tour Down Under recipients are aged under twenty-six. Recipients are commonly known as the Best young rider.

In stage racing, the fastest overall time of all riders below the age limit is awarded the cycling jersey, often the jersey color is white, in the same fashion the fastest time of all riders (regardless of age) is awarded in the general classification.

If the best young rider is also the leader of the general classification, points classification or mountains classification, then the rider wears the most prestigious jersey and the next young rider in the classification not holding a more prestigious jersey will wear the young rider jersey. Article 2.6.018 of the UCI regulations on road cycling states: 

"On the basis of the classifications, only 4 leader’s jerseys of the race can be issued in events of the UCI WorldTour and continental circuits of classes HC and 1 for the men elite and under 23, and a maximum of 6 jerseys in other events. Only the leader's jersey for the individual general classification by time is compulsory.

The leader of each classification, except the team classification, shall be required to wear the corresponding distinctive jersey.

If a rider is leading more than one classification, the order of priority of the distinctive jerseys shall be as follows:

1. general classification by time;

2. general classification by points;

3. general climber's classification;

4. others (young rider, combined, etc.); the order of priority among these other jerseys shall be set by the organiser.

In this situation, the organiser may require another rider next on the relevant classification to wear a jersey which is not being worn by the leader of that classification. However, if this rider must wear his world or national champion's jersey, or the leader's jersey of a UCI cup, circuit, series or classification, he shall wear that jersey.

In the situation where the leader of a classification does not take the start of a stage, the virtual leader of the relevant classification is allowed to wear the related distinctive jersey, subject to the consent of both the organiser and the president of the commissaires’ panel.

The riders of the team leading the team classification shall be required to wear the corresponding distinctive bib number if required by the organiser.

The presentation of a team leader jersey is prohibited both in the protocol and in the race.

No leaders’ jersey of the race or distinctive sign can be worn by a rider during the first day (prologue or stage) of a stage race.

Wearing a leader’s jersey or distinctive sign is prohibited in the case referred to in article
1.3.055 bis, point 5."

Young rider classification winners of the Grand Tours

Until 2016, the young rider classification existed only in two of the three Grand Tours, the Tour de France and the Giro d'Italia. The Vuelta a España introduced an award for the best young rider in its 2017 edition. However, in the 2017 and 2018 editions, the awardee did not wear a white jersey, but a red number bib instead. The white jersey was awarded at the Vuelta for the first time in the 2019 edition as the organizers had decided to eliminate the combination classification.

Winners by year

Career doubles
Source:

The Tour/Giro double has been achieved by three riders:
  Andy Schleck - 1 Giro white jersey (2007), 3 Tour white jerseys (2008, 2009, 2010)
  Nairo Quintana - 1 Giro white jersey (2014), 2 Tour white jerseys (2013, 2015)
  Egan Bernal - 1 Giro white jersey (2021), 1 Tour white jersey (2019)

The Giro/Vuelta double has been achieved by one rider:
  Miguel Ángel López - 2 Giro white jerseys (2018, 2019), 1  Vuelta red number bib (2017)

The Tour/Vuelta double has been achieved by one rider:
  Tadej Pogačar - 1 Vuelta white jersey (2019), 3 Tour white jerseys (2020, 2021, 2022)

Most white jerseys
4: Andy Schleck - 
 Giro d'Italia (2007)
 Tour de France (2008, 2009, 2010)
4: Tadej Pogačar - 
 Tour de France (2020, 2021, 2022)
 Vuelta a España (2019)
3: Jan Ullrich - 
 Tour de France  (1996, 1997, 1998)
3: Nairo Quintana - 
 Giro d'Italia (2014)
 Tour de France (2013, 2015)
3: Miguel Ángel López - 
 Giro d'Italia (2018, 2019)
 Vuelta a España (2017)2: Vladimir Poulnikov -  Giro d'Italia (1989, 1990)2: Pavel Tonkov -  Giro d'Italia (1992, 1993)2: Marco Pantani -  Tour de France (1994, 1995)2: Bob Jungels -  Giro d'Italia (2016, 2017)2: Enric Mas -  Vuelta a España (2018, 2020)2: Egan Bernal - '''
 Giro d'Italia (2021)
 Tour de France (2019)

References

Road bicycle racing terminology
Grand Tour (cycling)
Cycling records and statistics